Senior Minister of Singapore is a position in the Cabinet of Singapore. Holders of this office have served as either the prime minister or the deputy prime minister. Among the executive branch officeholders in the order of precedence, the position ranks after the prime minister and the deputy prime minister. They also serve as part of the Prime Minister's Office and work at The Istana.

Background
S. Rajaratnam, Singapore's first Minister for Foreign Affairs, took on the newly-created role of Senior Minister in 1985 before retiring in 1988. Prior to that, he served as Deputy Prime Minister between 1980 and 1985. 

Lee Kuan Yew, Singapore's first Prime Minister, was appointed as Senior Minister in 1990, after being succeeded by Goh Chok Tong as prime minister. He was ranked second in the order of precedence, superseding the incumbent Deputy Prime Ministers Lee Hsien Loong and Ong Teng Cheong.

Goh Chok Tong was appointed Senior Minister in 2004 after handing over the office of Prime Minister to Lee Hsien Loong. As Senior Minister, he was ranked second in the order of precedence, while Lee Kuan Yew, who was appointed as Minister Mentor, ranked third in the order of precedence.

S. Jayakumar relinquished his role as Deputy Prime Minister in 2009 and was appointed as Senior Minister before retiring from politics in 2011. 

After the 2011 general election, Minister Mentor Lee Kuan Yew and Senior Minister Goh Chok Tong left the Cabinet but remained as Members of Parliament. Goh accepted an honorary title of Emeritus Senior Minister (ESM); Lee was also offered a similar title but he declined and continued to serve as a Member of Parliament until his death on 23 March 2015.

Between 21 May 2011 and 1 May 2019, the office of Senior Minister was vacant. After this eight-year gap, two former Deputy Prime Ministers Teo Chee Hean and Tharman Shanmugaratnam was appointed as Senior Ministers, after being succeeded by  Heng Swee Keat as Deputy Prime Minister.

List of senior ministers
The Senior Minister is appointed as part of the Cabinet of Singapore. The incumbent ministers are Teo Chee Hean and Tharman Shanmugaratnam.

See also
 Prime Minister of Singapore
 Prime Minister's Office (PMO)
 Deputy Prime Minister of Singapore
 Minister Mentor

References 

1985 establishments in Singapore
Government ministers of Singapore

zh:國務資政